Alfredo Carrow Brown (1 December 1886 – 30 August 1958)  was an Argentine international footballer who played as a forward.

Early life
Brown was an Argentine of Scottish origin.

Brown had four brothers who were also Argentine international players – Carlos, Eliseo, Ernesto and Jorge – as well as one cousin, Juan Domingo. Two other brothers – Diego and Tomás – were also footballers.

Career
Brown played club football for Alumni, and international football for the Argentina national team. Brown was top-scorer in the Primera División in the 1904 season.

References

1886 births
1958 deaths
Argentine footballers
Argentina international footballers
Argentine people of Scottish descent
Argentine Primera División players
Alumni Athletic Club players
Association football forwards
Brown family (Argentina)